Amina Said, also spelled Amina Saïd (born 1953 in Tunis) is a Tunisian author and poet. Her father is Tunisian and her mother is French. Said has been living in Paris since 1978, where she studied literature at the Sorbonne. She has published several books of poetry, Tunisian folk stories, short stories and essays. Much of her work has been translated into other languages, mainly Arabic, German, Turkish, English and Italian. Said has translated works by the Filipino writer Francisco Sionil José from English into French.

The Australian composer Richard Mills used her poetry for his work Songlines of the Heart's Desire (2007).

Awards
Said received the Jean Malrieu Prize in 1989 for Feu d'oiseaux, and in 1994, the Charles Vildrac Prize.

Selected works 
Paysages, nuit friable, 1980, Éditions Barbare
Métamorphose de l'île et de la vague, 1985, Arcantère, Paris
Sables funambules, 1988, Arcantère/ 
Feu d'oiseaux, 1989, Les Cahiers du Sud, Marseille
Nul autre lieu, 1992, Écrits des Forges, Quebec 
L'une et l'autre nuit, 1993, Editions le Dé bleu, France
Marcher sur la Terre, 1994, Paris
Gisements de lumière, 1998, Éditions de la Différence, Paris

References

External links
5th Poetry Africa Festival, 2001

1953 births
Writers from Tunis
French-language poets
Tunisian writers in French
Tunisian translators
English–French translators
University of Paris alumni
Living people
20th-century Tunisian women writers
20th-century Tunisian writers
21st-century Tunisian women writers
21st-century Tunisian writers